The Chota was a 6 hp English cyclecar manufactured from 1912 until 1913 by the Buckingham Engine Works of Coventry. Chota is Hindustani for "small".

The car was designed by J. F. Buckingham and had a 746 cc single-cylinder engine of Buckingham's own design. A larger 1492 cc model was added in 1913.

The Chota was renamed the Buckingham in September 1913.

See also
 List of car manufacturers of the United Kingdom

References

Sources

David Burgess Wise, The New Illustrated Encyclopedia of Automobiles.

Cyclecars
Defunct motor vehicle manufacturers of England
Coventry motor companies